The Minimoog is an analog synthesizer first manufactured by Moog Music between 1970 and 1981. Designed as a more affordable, portable version of the modular Moog synthesizer, it was the first synthesizer sold in retail stores. It was first popular with progressive rock and jazz musicians and found wide use in disco, pop, rock and electronic music.

Production of the Minimoog stopped in the early 1980s after the sale of Moog Music. In 2002, founder Robert Moog regained the rights to the Moog brand, bought the company, and released an updated version of the Minimoog, the Minimoog Voyager. In 2016 and in 2022, Moog Music released another new version of the original Minimoog.

Development 

In the 1960s, RA Moog Co manufactured Moog synthesizers, which helped bring electronic sounds to music but remained inaccessible to ordinary people. These modular synthesizers were difficult to use and required users to connect components manually with patch cables to create sounds. They were also sensitive to temperature and humidity, and cost tens of thousands of dollars. Most were owned by universities or record labels, and used to create soundtracks or jingles; by 1970, only 28 were owned by musicians.

Hoping to create a smaller, more reliable synthesizer, Moog engineer Bill Hemsath created a prototype by sawing a keyboard in half and wiring several components into a small cabinet. Moog president Robert Moog felt the prototype was fun, but did not initially see a market for it. Moog and the engineers created several more prototypes, adding features such as the suitcase design to aid portability.

In early 1970, Moog Co began losing money as interest in its modular synthesizers fell. Fearing they would lose their jobs if the company closed, the engineers developed a version of Hemsath's miniature synthesizer, the Minimoog Model D, while Moog was away. Moog chastised them, but came to see the potential in the Model D and authorized its production.

As the engineers could not properly stabilize the power supply, the Minimoog's three oscillators were never completely synchronized. Although unintentional, this created the synthesizer's "warm, rich" sound. Its voltage-controlled filter was unique, allowing users to shape sounds to create "everything from blistering, funky bass blurps ... to spacey whistle lead tones". The Minimoog also was the first synthesizer to feature a pitch wheel, which allows players to bend notes as a guitarist or saxophonist does, allowing for more expressive playing. Moog's associate David Borden felt that Moog would have become extremely wealthy had he patented the pitch wheel.

Release 
Moog Co released the first Minimoog in 1970. Moog said it was conceived as a portable tool for session musicians, and the team expected to sell "maybe 100 of them".  Moog became acquainted with former evangelist and musician David Van Koevering, who was so impressed with the Minimoog that he began demonstrating it to musicians and music stores. Van Koevering's friend Glen Bell, founder of the restaurant chain Taco Bell, allowed him to use a building on a private island Bell owned in Florida. There, Van Koevering hosted an event he billed as Island of Electronicus, a "pseudo-psychedelic experience that brought counterculture (minus the drugs) to straight families and connected it with the sound of the Minimoog". 

The Minimoog was in continuous production for 13 years and over 12,000 were made. It was the first synthesizer sold in retail stores. Despite the success, Moog Co could not afford to meet demand, nor had credit for a loan, and Moog sold the company to Bill Waytena, a venture capitalist, in 1971. Van Koevering was hired as head of sales and marketing, expanding the sales of the Minimoog worldwide. Production of the Minimoog stopped in 1981 and Moog Co ceased all production in 1993.

Later models 
In the 1980s, the rights to use the Moog Music name in the United Kingdom were purchased by Alex Winter of Caerphilly, Wales, who commenced limited production of an updated Minimoog in 1998 as the Moog Minimoog 204E. The 204E added pulse width modulation and MIDI to the Model D specification.
In 2002, Robert Moog reacquired the rights to the Moog name and bought the company. In 2002, Moog Co released the Minimoog Voyager, an updated version of the Minimoog that sold more than 14,000 units, more than the original Minimoog. Although the Welsh incarnation of Moog Music went into administration shortly afterwards, Winter retained the rights to the Moog name in the UK, with the result that the Minimoog Voyager was launched there as the Voyager by Bob Moog.

In 2016, Moog Music began manufacturing an updated version of the Model D, with an independent LFO and MIDI, and an aftertouch and velocity-sensitive keyboard. Production ended around August 2017. In 2018, Moog Music released the Minimoog Model D app for iOS.

Impact 
According to TJ Pinch, author of Analog Days, the Minimoog was the first synthesizer to become a "classic". Wired described it as "the most famous synthesizer in music history ... a ubiquitous analog keyboard that can be heard in countless pop, rock, hip-hop, and techno tracks from the 1970s, 80s, and 90s". It was also important for its portability. David Borden, an associate of Moog, said that the Minimoog "took the synthesizer out of the studio and put it into the concert hall". According to the Guardian, "Tweaked now so that the synthesizer could reliably perform as either a melodic lead or propulsive bass instrument (rather than just as a complex sound-generating machine), the Minimoog changed everything ... the Moogs oozed character. Their sound could be quirky, kitsch and cute, or pulverising, but it was always identifiable as Moog."

The Minimoog changed the dynamics of rock bands. For the first time, keyboardists could play solos in the style of lead guitarists, or play synthesized basslines. Yes keyboardist Rick Wakeman said: "For the first time you could go on [stage] and give the guitarist a run for his money... A guitarist would say, 'Oh shoot, he's got a Minimoog,' so they're looking for eleven on their volume control - it's the only way they can compete." Wakeman said the instrument "absolutely changed the face of music".

The Minimoog took a place in mainstream black music, most notably in the work of Stevie Wonder. Its use for basslines became particularly popular in funk, as in the Parliament track "Flash Light". It was also popular in jazz, and Sun Ra became perhaps the first musician to perform and record with the instrument (on his 1970 album My Brother the Wind). Herbie Hancock, Dick Hyman and Chick Corea were other early adopters.

The Minimoog became a staple of progressive rock. In the early 1970s, Keith Emerson of Emerson, Lake & Palmer added the Minimoog to his modular 'Monster Moog' as an occasional part of his performances. Wakeman used five Minimoogs on stage so he could play different sounds without having to reconfigure them. It was also used by electronic artists such as Kraftwerk, who used it on their albums Autobahn (1974) and The Man-Machine (1978), and later by Tangerine Dream, Klaus Schulze, and Gary Numan. In the late 1970s and the early 1980s, it was widely used in the emerging disco genre by artists including ABBA and Giorgio Moroder.

In 2012, to celebrate Bob Moog's birthday, Google created an interactive Minimoog softsynth web application as its Google Doodle.

See also
 Multimoog
 Micromoog
 Memorymoog
 Polymoog

References

Further reading

External links 
 Minimoog at Synthmuseum.com
 Minimoog at Vintage Synth Explorer
 Minimoog at SynthSale
 Minimoog Resource
 Minimoog D info, pictures and audio clips
 Moog Music's Minimoog Model D app

Moog synthesizers
Monophonic synthesizers
Analog synthesizers